Canarsie Pol is an uninhabited island south of Canarsie, Brooklyn in Jamaica Bay, New York City. It is part of Gateway National Recreation Area. On 1910 maps, the island was originally much smaller; however, when nearby waterways were dredged to expand them for improved navigation, the sand and soil were piled on Canarsie Pol. Near the island are other islands and marshes in the bay.

References

Islands of New York City
Uninhabited islands of New York (state)
Islands of Brooklyn
Canarsie, Brooklyn
Gateway National Recreation Area